Lost Boyz are an American hip hop group from Queens, New York, consisting of MC Mr. Cheeks, Freaky Kah, and K Chrys.

Originally in the early 90's LB consisted of Mr. Cheeks, Freaky Tah, Spigg Nice, and Pretty Lou.

History 
In 1995, the group released their debut single "Lifestyles of the Rich & Shameless", charting on the Billboard Hot 100. The release landed them a record deal with Uptown Records. They contributed a single to the Don't Be a Menace to South Central While Drinking Your Juice in the Hood soundtrack, titled "Renee". The song became a major hit, breaking into the Top 40 on the Hot 100 chart. The single also reached Gold status in 1996. On June 4, 1996, the group released their debut album Legal Drug Money. The work was highly acclaimed, and featured five Hot 100 hits, including their past singles "Lifestyles of the Rich & Shameless", "Renee", "Music Makes Me High", "Jeeps, Lex Coups, Bimaz & Benz", and "Get Up". The album was certified Gold by the RIAA in late 1996.

Their second album, Love, Peace & Nappiness, was released on June 17, 1997, through Uptown/Universal Records. It featured another Hot 100 single, "Me & My Crazy World". One of the most famous songs on the album was the posse cut "Beasts from the East", featuring A+, Redman, and Canibus. The album was not as acclaimed as their debut, but fared well commercially, reaching Gold status in late 1997.

In 1996, the group appeared on the Red Hot Organization's compilation CD America Is Dying Slowly, alongside Wu-Tang Clan, Coolio, and Fat Joe, among others. The CD, meant to raise awareness of the AIDS epidemic among African-American men, was heralded as "a masterpiece" by The Source magazine.

Freaky Tah was murdered in Queens on March 28, 1999. The three remaining group members finished their third album, LB IV Life, released in September 1999, but the album was not a commercial or artistic success, and Mr. Cheeks left to begin a solo career. On January 16, 2004, Spigg Nice was tried and convicted of multiple bank robberies in New Jersey and was sentenced to 37 years in prison. he was released in 2021, the same year group appeared on Nick Cannons Wild 'N Out show on VH1 to perform a song from their 2020 album Legacy.

Members

Current 

 Mr. Cheeks
 Freaky Kah
 K Chrys

Former 

 Freaky Tah (deceased)
 Spigg Nice
 Pretty Lou

Discography 

Legal Drug Money (1996)
Love, Peace & Nappiness (1997)
LB IV Life (1999)
Next Generation (2019)
LEGACY (2020)

References

External links 

African-American musical groups
Five percenters
Hip hop groups from New York City
Musical groups disestablished in 1999
Musical groups from Queens, New York
Musical quartets
Universal Records artists